Watsonidia is a genus of moths in the family Erebidae. The genus was erected by Hervé de Toulgoët in 1981.

Species
Watsonidia navatteae
Watsonidia pardea
Watsonidia porioni
Watsonidia reimona

References

Phaegopterina
Heteroneura genera